Younis Khalifa Al-Mushaifri (born 24 October 1981), commonly known as Younis Al-Mushaifri, is an Omani footballer and a former Volleyball player.

Volleyball career
Younis took a break from football after playing for Al-Suwaiq Club's junior teams in 1998 and became a volleyball player. In 1998, he signed a long-term contract with Al-Shabab Club to represent the club in the various top level volleyball leagues in the region.

Club career

On 27 July 2013, he signed a one-year contract with Al-Shabab Club. On 14 July 2014, he signed a one-year contract with Dhofar S.C.S.C. Afterwards, he returned to Al-Shabab.

Club career statistics

International career
Younis was selected for the national team for the first time in 2006. He has made appearances in the 2007 AFC Asian Cup qualification, the 2007 AFC Asian Cup and the 2010 FIFA World Cup qualification.

Honours

Club
With Dhofar
Oman Professional League Cup (0): Runner-up 2014–15
Baniyas SC International Tournament (1): Winner 2014

References

External links
 
 
 Younis Al-Mushaifri at Goal.com
 
 

1981 births
Living people
Omani footballers
Oman international footballers
Omani expatriate footballers
Association football forwards
2007 AFC Asian Cup players
Al-Musannah SC players
Kazma SC players
Fanja SC players
Al-Shabab SC (Seeb) players
Dhofar Club players
Oman Professional League players
Expatriate footballers in Kuwait
Omani expatriate sportspeople in Kuwait
People from Al Batinah North Governorate
Kuwait Premier League players
Al Tadhamon SC players
Al-Seeb Club players
Al-Nasr SC (Salalah) players